Araeolaimidae is a family of marine free living nematodes.

References 

 Araeolaimidae at WoRMS

Araeolaimida
Nematode families